Arbanasi Nunatak (Nunatak Arbanasi \'nu-na-tak ar-ba-'na-si\) is a 320 m high rocky peak in Vidin Heights on Varna Peninsula, Livingston Island in Antarctica.  The peak was named after the settlement and monastery of Arbanasi near the old Bulgarian capital of Veliko Tarnovo.

Location

See also
 Tangra 2004/05
 Livingston Island
 List of Bulgarian toponyms in Antarctica
 Antarctic Place-names Commission

Maps
 L.L. Ivanov et al. Antarctica: Livingston Island and Greenwich Island, South Shetland Islands. Scale 1:100000 topographic map. Sofia: Antarctic Place-names Commission of Bulgaria, 2005.
 L.L. Ivanov. Antarctica: Livingston Island and Greenwich, Robert, Snow and Smith Islands. Scale 1:120000 topographic map.  Troyan: Manfred Wörner Foundation, 2009.

References
 Arbanasi Nunatak. SCAR Composite Gazetteer of Antarctica
 Bulgarian Antarctic Gazetteer. Antarctic Place-names Commission. (details in Bulgarian, basic data in English)

External links
 Arbanasi Nunatak. Copernix satellite image

Nunataks of Livingston Island